Regatta at Argenteuil is a c. 1872 painting by Claude Monet, now in the Musée d'Orsay. It was left to the French state in 1894 by the painter and collector Gustave Caillebotte.

See also
List of paintings by Claude Monet

References

Argenteuil
Paintings by Claude Monet
1872 paintings
Paintings in the collection of the Musée d'Orsay
Maritime paintings